The Valenti Modified Racing Series, also known as the Modified Racing Series, is a modified stock car racing sanctioning body based out of Canaan, New Hampshire. The series sanctions modified races throughout New England. The cars are similar to the NASCAR Whelen Modified Tour modifieds, allowing competitors from the Whelen Modified Tour to race in the Valenti Modified Racing Series. The series draws a large number of fans and drivers to each race, earning itself a well known reputation between track owners, fans, and drivers.

Series champions

External links
Official website
Official Facebook Page

References

2004 establishments in the United States
Auto racing organizations in the United States
Sports governing bodies in the United States
Sports leagues in the United States
Stock car racing